Enrique "Coti" Nosiglia (born 1949),  is an Argentine politician. He served as Minister of Interior for president Raúl Alfonsín. He promoted the 2015 alliance between the Radical Civic Union and the Republican Proposal, which created the Cambiemos alliance.

in 2019, he filed a lawsuit against Elisa Carrió, the Argentine National Deputy for Buenos Aires, for alleged insults (defamation) made against him.

References

Ministers of Internal Affairs of Argentina
Radical Civic Union politicians
1949 births
Living people